Kaloyan Baev (born 21 August 1972) is a Bulgarian wrestler. He competed at the 1992 Summer Olympics and the 1996 Summer Olympics.

References

External links
 

1972 births
Living people
Bulgarian male sport wrestlers
Olympic wrestlers of Bulgaria
Wrestlers at the 1992 Summer Olympics
Wrestlers at the 1996 Summer Olympics
Sportspeople from Varna, Bulgaria